Chevalier John Ladislaus Pitchaiya Roche Victoria  (b. 26 September 1894 - d. 15 October 1962) was an Indian politician from Tuticorin belonging to the Indian National Congress. He was from a wealthy and eminent Paravar family and was also a businessman with ownership in several commercial ventures. During 1926-46 he was the chairman of the Tuticorin Municipality. He was a member of the Madras Presidency Legislative Assembly during 1937-42 and a nominated member of the Madras Legislative Council from 1946. He served as the minister for Food and Fisheries in the P. S. Kumaraswami Raja cabinet during 2 June 1949 – 8 February 1952. He was elected to the Tamil Nadu legislative assembly as an Indian National Congress candidate from Tuticorin constituency in the 1952 election. He was also the governor of the Rotary district 320 (covering Sri Lanka and South India).

Victoria became a Chevalier of the Order of St. Gregory the Great.  The Roche park in Tuticorin is named after him.

References 

Indian National Congress politicians from Tamil Nadu
1894 births
1962 deaths
Tamil Nadu ministers
People from Thoothukudi